Joel Eriksson (born 28 June 1998) is a Swedish racing driver who last competed in the 2021 ADAC GT Masters with KÜS Team Bernhard.

Career

Karting
Eriksson began his karting career in 2007. He remained in karting until 2014.

Formula 4
In 2014, Eriksson made his debut in open-wheel racing in the ADAC Formel Masters. In 2015 he stayed in the series, now called ADAC Formula 4, and finished the season second in the standings.

F3 European Championship
In 2016, Eriksson moved to the FIA Formula 3 European Championship with Motopark. He won one race at Spa-Francorchamps and was 5th in the championship standings. He continued with the team into the 2017 season, where he was runner-up to Carlin's Lando Norris with 7 wins.

DTM
Two seasons in the Deutsche Tourenwagen Masters driving for BMW Team RBM followed. Eriksson achieved his maiden DTM victory in 2018 at Misano in a rain-drenched night race, becoming the second-youngest DTM race winner in the process. He racked up a further two podiums the following year.

Formula E

Eriksson tested Formula E machinery for the first time in January 2018, driving for DS Virgin Racing in the 2018 rookie test at Marrakesh.

Eriksson was named by Dragon Racing as its official test and reserve driver for the 2019–20 season, taking part in the March 2020 rookie test at Marrakesh. He retained the role the following year as the team rebranded as Dragon / Penske Autosport. He made his debut in the championship at the 2021 Puebla ePrix, replacing regular driver Nico Müller, who left the team due to several clashing commitments. He finished the 2021 season with one point in eight races.

Personal life

Eriksson is the younger brother of racing driver Jimmy Eriksson, who raced in the 2016 GP2 season.

Racing record

Career summary

Complete ADAC Formula 4 Championship results 
(key) (Races in bold indicate pole position) (Races in italics indicate fastest lap)

Complete FIA Formula 3 European Championship results
(key) (Races in bold indicate pole position) (Races in italics indicate fastest lap)

Complete Deutsche Tourenwagen Masters results
(key) (Races in bold indicate pole position) (Races in italics indicate fastest lap)

† Driver retired, but was classified as they completed 75% of the winner's race distance.

Complete Formula E results
(key) (Races in bold indicate pole position; races in italics indicate fastest lap)

Complete British GT Championship results
(key) (Races in bold indicate pole position) (Races in italics indicate fastest lap)

References

External links
 

1998 births
Living people
Swedish racing drivers
ADAC Formel Masters drivers
ADAC Formula 4 drivers
SMP F4 Championship drivers
FIA Formula 3 European Championship drivers
Deutsche Tourenwagen Masters drivers
International GT Open drivers
Motopark Academy drivers
Koiranen GP drivers
BMW M drivers
Racing Bart Mampaey drivers
Dragon Racing drivers
ADAC GT Masters drivers
Asian Le Mans Series drivers
Formula E drivers
British GT Championship drivers
24H Series drivers